John Moffatt Chambers (6 December 1901 – 1 July 1983) was an Australian rules footballer who played with Geelong in the Victorian Football League (VFL). He was inducted into the Geelong Hall of Fame in 2011.

A strong marking ruckman, Chambers was cleared to Geelong in 1924, having been on Essendon's list.

Chambers was a half forward flanker in the Geelong team which won the 1925 VFL Grand Final, their first ever premiership.

In 1926 Chambers represented Victoria in an interstate match against Western Australia in Perth.

Chambers kicked a career best 28 goals in 1928, from 18 games, to finish as Geelong's leading goal-kicker.

Chambers had a son, John Chambers, who played Sheffield Shield cricket for Victoria as a batsman.

References

External links

1901 births
1983 deaths
Geelong Football Club players
Geelong Football Club Premiership players
Australian rules footballers from Melbourne
One-time VFL/AFL Premiership players
People from Broadmeadows, Victoria